The 1990 Bowling Green Falcons football team was an American football team that represented Bowling Green State University in the Mid-American Conference (MAC) during the 1990 NCAA Division I-A football season. In their fifth and final season under head coach Moe Ankney, the Falcons compiled a 3–5–2 record (2–4–2 against MAC opponents), finished in sixth place in the MAC, and were outscored by all opponents by a combined total of 163 to 138.

The team's statistical leaders included Erik White with 1,386 passing yards, George Johnson with 427 rushing yards, and Mark Szlachcic with 582 receiving yards.

Schedule

References

Bowling Green
Bowling Green Falcons football seasons
Bowling Green Falcons football